Russellville is a home rule-class city in Logan County, Kentucky, in the United States. It is the seat of its county. The population was 6,960 at the time of the 2010 census.

History

Local historian Alex C. Finley has claimed the area was first settled by Gasper Butcher, as a frontier settlement of the Transylvania Colony of Virginia, around 1780, but others have questioned this claim. Although the area is known to have been called "Big  Boiling Spring", "Gasper Butcher's Spring", and "Butcher's Station", W.R. Jillson was unable to find written records of any habitation before 1790. That year William Cook and his wife erected Cook's Cabin, accompanied by eighteen-year-old William Stewart. It was renamed "Logan Court House" when it was chosen as the seat of newly formed Logan County in 1792.

General William Russell was given a  grant here for his military service during the American Revolution. He donated part of this property, in 1795, as a platted section for the county seat, known as Logan Court House. The town was renamed in Russell's honor in 1798. It was formally established by the state legislature on January 15, 1810. It was incorporated as a city on February 19, 1840.

In the early 19th century, the community had leaders who were politically prominent in the state. Four homes in the city still stand that were residences of future governors of Kentucky: John Breathitt, James Morehead, John J. Crittenden, and Charles S. Morehead.

During the Civil War, the Kentucky General Assembly declared its neutrality and declined to secede with the rest of the South. Kentucky was a slave state and Confederate sentiment was strong in the Bluegrass region and the west, but the residents of the mountainous eastern section were mainly small farmers and pro-Union. In the summer of 1862, when Confederate troops had occupied the area, 116 prominent pro-Confederates from 43 counties met as the Russellville Convention and created a rival Confederate government for Kentucky. George W. Johnson was elected as the state's Confederate governor. Despite de facto Union control over the rest of Kentucky, the government was recognized and Kentucky admitted to the Confederacy. Kentucky was represented by the thirteenth star on the Confederate flag. During the war, there were several minor skirmishes in and around Russellville.

After the war, Kentucky struggled for some years with insurgent unrest. A gang made up of the former Confederate guerrillas Cole Younger, George Shepard, and Oliver Shepard, along with Confederate veterans John Jarrett and Arthur McCoy, robbed the Nimrod Long Bank or the Southern Deposit Bank in Russellville on March 20, 1868. Brothers Frank and Jesse James, who later had their own outlaw gang based in western Missouri, may have taken part. A Russellville bank on the city square displays a large mural painted depicting the robbery. A reenactment (called a "play on horseback") is performed annually during the city's Tobacco and Heritage Festival.

Several downtown homes have been listed on the National Register of Historic Places including the Victorian Mansion at 224 Cornelius Avenue, a house that boasted the state's first indoor bathroom.

Geography
Russellville is located in central Logan County.

The city is set among small hills in the valley of the Town Branch, a north-flowing tributary of the Mud River and part of the Green River watershed flowing to the Ohio River.

Russellville is served by U.S. Routes 68, 79 and 431. The nearest limited-access highway is the Natcher Parkway (Interstate 165),  to the northeast.

Climate
The climate in this area is characterized by hot, humid summers and generally mild to cool winters.  According to the Köppen Climate Classification system, Russellville has a humid subtropical climate, abbreviated "Cfa" on climate maps.

Demographics

As of the census of 2000, there were 7,149 people, 3,064 households, and 1,973 families residing in the city. The racial makeup of the city was 78.64% White, 18.62% African American, 0.39% Native American, 0.36% Asian, 0.03% Pacific Islander, 0.57% from other races, and 1.38% from two or more races. Hispanic or Latino of any race were 1.58% of the population.

There were 3,064 households, out of which 27.4% had children under the age of 18 living with them, 43.4% were married couples living together, 17.4% had a female householder with no husband present, and 35.6% were non-families. 32.6% of all households were made up of individuals, and 15.8% had someone living alone who was 65 years of age or older. The average household size was 2.26 and the average family size was 2.84.

In the city, the population was spread out, with 23.7% under the age of 18, 9.0% from 18 to 24, 25.1% from 25 to 44, 24.3% from 45 to 64, and 18.0% who were 65 years of age or older. The median age was 39 years. For every 100 females, there were 82.6 males. For every 100 females age 18 and over, there were 79.9 males.

The median income for a household in the city was $25,647, and the median income for a family was $31,448. Males had a median income of $27,529 versus $20,032 for females. The per capita income for the city was $15,654. About 17.1% of families and 23.0% of the population were below the poverty line, including 37.0% of those under age 18 and 20.4% of those age 65 or over.

Economy
Amid a largely agricultural area, Russellville is home to manufacturers of a number of products from pet food to plastics. The area's largest employer, Logan Aluminum, employs over 1,300 people.

Education
Russellville has a lending library, a branch of the Logan County Public Library.

Notable people

 Philip Alston, counterfeiter and early settler near Russellville
 Athena Cage, recording artist, producer, and songwriter
 Ann Mary Butler Crittenden Coleman (1813–1891), author, translator
 George B. Crittenden (1812–80), Confederate Army major general during the Civil War
 John J. Crittenden (1787–1863), U.S. attorney general, Kentucky governor, U.S. senator, and U.S. representative
 Thomas L. Crittenden (1819–93), Union Army major general during the Civil War
 Alice Allison Dunnigan, first female African American correspondent for Congress and the White House
 William Jefferson Hardin, black legislator
 Elijah Hise, congressman from Kentucky
 Joseph Jefferson, NFL player
 Holly Goddard Jones, novelist
 Finis McLean, congressman from Kentucky
 Andre Morris, former world record holder in track and field
 Elijah Hise Norton, congressman from Missouri
 Presley O'Bannon, United States Marine Corps officer and hero of the First Barbary War; resided in Russellville
 Kelley Paul, writer and wife of current U.S. Senator Rand Paul
 Jim Price, former NBA player
 Mike Price, basketball player
 Green Pinckney Russell, American teacher, principal, school district supervisor, and college president
 Fletcher Stockdale, a governor of Texas
 Mark Thompson (pitcher), MLB player
 Bubba Wells, former NBA player
 Terrence W. Wilcutt, NASA astronaut

See also
 News Democrat & Leader

References

External links
 City of Russellville official website

Cities in Logan County, Kentucky
Cities in Kentucky
Populated places established in 1790
County seats in Kentucky